The Memorial to Heroes of the Marine Engine Room is a granite monument located on St. Nicholas Place, at the Pier Head, in Liverpool, England.

History
The memorial was intended originally to commemorate all 32 engineers who lost their lives in the sinking of Titanic on 15 April 1912. Liverpool was the Titanic port of registry, as well as the home of the ship's owner, White Star Line. Construction was funded by international public subscription.

Spaces were left on the monument to record the names of other engineers. However, due to the heavy loss of life throughout World War I, its dedication was broadened to include all maritime engine room fatalities incurred during the performance of duty. Shrapnel damage from bombs that fell during the Second World War can be clearly seen on the monument.

Design

It is constructed in the form of a granite obelisk standing on a square chamfered pedestal. The obelisk is topped with a gilded flame. Each of its bottom corners is decorated with carved representations of the four classical elements.

The east and west side of the pedestal feature carved life-size sculptures of stokers and engineers. Pevsner describes these figures as "strikingly naturalistic" and are noted as focusing on working class heroism. When the monument was designed, the use of manual labourers and workers was an uncommon subject in British public art and their inclusion by Goscombe John was considered innovative. Historic England describe the memorial as having a considerable influence on the future design of war memorials, calling it "one of the most artistically significant memorials to the Titanic disaster on either side of the Atlantic".

See also
Grade II* listed war memorials in England
List of statues and sculptures in Liverpool

References

External links
 Titanic: From Boiler Room 5 to Lifeboat 13 (Kevin E. Phillips)
A Last Bright Shining Lie, by Senan Molony {copyrighted}

Monuments and memorials in Liverpool
RMS Titanic memorials
Granite sculptures in the United Kingdom
Outdoor sculptures in England
1916 sculptures
Grade II* listed buildings in Liverpool
Grade II* listed monuments and memorials